Bojan Dimoski (born 23 November 2001) is a Macedonian professional footballer who plays as a left back as well as a defensive midfielder for Akademija Pandev in the First Macedonian Football League.

Career

Club career
Dimoski made his senior football debut on 24 February 2019 at the age of 17, by entering the game for Vardar at the start of the second halftime in the First Macedonian Football League match against Renova. That season he went on to play four more games, which secured him definite promotion at the club from the youth to the senior team. Bojan was regular in the upcoming 2019–20 season, which secured him a transfer to Akademija Pandev.

International
Ever since 2018 Dimoski has been regular at most of North Macedonia's national youth teams.

He made his debut for North Macedonia national football team on 12 June 2022 in a 2022–23 UEFA Nations League C against Gibraltar.

References

External links
 
 

2001 births
Living people
Sportspeople from Prilep
Association football fullbacks
Macedonian footballers
Macedonian expatriate footballers
North Macedonia youth international footballers
North Macedonia under-21 international footballers
North Macedonia international footballers
FK Vardar players
Akademija Pandev players
Macedonian First Football League players